Ida Bagus Rai Dharmawijaya Mantra is an Indonesian politician and the mayor of Denpasar.

References

External links
Inhuman Attacks - Bali Travel News

Indonesian Hindus
Balinese people
Living people
Mayors and regents of places in Bali
People from Denpasar
Politicians from Bali
1967 births
Mayors of places in Indonesia